The 2012 Coca-Cola GM was the 42nd edition of the Greenlandic Men's Football Championship. The final round was held in Ilulissat from August 5 to 11. It was won by B-67 Nuuk for the eighth time in its history.

Qualifying stage

North Greenland
FC Malamuk and Upernavik BK 83 qualified for the final Round.

Disko Bay
G-44 Qeqertarsuaq and Kugsak-45 qualified for the final Round.

NB Nagdlunguaq-48 qualified for the final Round as hosts.

Central Greenland
B-67 Nuuk and Siumut Amerdlok Kunuk qualified for the final Round.

East Greenland
A.T.A.-60 qualified for the final Round.

South Greenland

Final round

Pool 1

Pool 2

Playoffs

Semi-finals

Third place match

Final

See also
Football in Greenland
Football Association of Greenland
Greenland national football team
Greenlandic Men's Football Championship

References

Greenlandic Men's Football Championship seasons
Green
Green
Foot